Marlu is an extinct genus of Pseudocheiridae from the Oligocene–Miocene of Australia. It consists of  five species found at various sites in Australia. M. kutjamarpensis, M. karya, M. sykes and M. ampelos from the Miocene in the Kutjamarpu Local Fauna (Leaf Locality) in Queensland and from the Late Oligocene, M. praecursor from the Wadikali Local Fauna in northern South Australia.

References

Miocene marsupials
Oligocene marsupials
Prehistoric diprotodonts
Prehistoric mammals of Australia
Prehistoric marsupial genera